Sheikh Ahmad bin Hamad Al-Khalili (NP) (born 1942) is the Grand Mufti of the Sultanate of Oman.

Opinions
The Grand Mufti appears regularly on TV, where he answers the public's questions on Islam. He urged the government to ban alcohol in Oman, one of the more liberal states in the Arabian Peninsula.

However, he is a strong advocate for religious tolerance and works hard to ensure harmony between the different religious schools of thought in Oman.

Al-Khalili signed the Amman Message, which gives a broad foundation for defining Muslim orthodoxy.

In August 2021, he congratulated the Taliban for “the clear victory and the grand conquering of the aggressor invaders, and we also congratulate ourselves and the entire Islamic nation for the fulfillment of God’s sincere promise”.

Life 
Ahmed bin Hamad Al-Khalili was born on the island of Zanzibar on 27 July 1942, when Zanzibar was still under the rule of the al-Said sultans who originated from Oman. His tribal home is the town of Bahla.

He was appointed Director of the Ministry of Justice, Islamic Affairs and Awqaf and Islamic Affairs, and in 1395 (1975 CE), a royal decree appointed him the Grand Mufti of the Sultanate of Oman, the highest Islamic authority in Oman, after the death of the scholar  Ibrahim bin Said Al Abri.

Awards
 Nishan-e-Pakistan (2022)
 Nishan-e-Imtiaz (2022)

References

Living people
1942 births
Omani imams
Omani Ibadi Muslims
21st-century imams
Quran reciters
Zanzibari emigrants to Oman
Tanzanian emigrants to Oman
Tanzanian people of Omani descent
Omani judges
Grand Muftis of Oman
International Union of Muslim Scholars members
20th-century Omani people